The Jervois is a 35-storey tower designed by Florent Nédélec and located on 89 Jervois Street in Sheung Wan, Victoria, Hong Kong.

Description
The Jervois is a luxurious boutique hotel that combines a total of 49 suites. All suites are only accessible via private lift lobbies and feature floor to ceiling windows that offer views of Hong Kong. Typical floors have two suites per floor with double corner windows while the top five floor have only one suite per floor with 360 degrees views of Victoria Harbour, Hong Kong Central and Victoria Peak.

Design
The Jervois boutique hotel is a collaborative creation of two French designers, architect Florent Nédélec for the architectural design and furniture maker Christian Liaigre for the Interior decoration.

See also
 Yong He Yuan

References

External links
 
 Florent Nédélec Architecture official website
 2012 Wallpaper Magazine, September 2012, Best Business Hotel 2012
 Air France Magazine 2012, May 2012, 10 raisons to go to Hong Kong
 Perspective Magazine, June 2012, A Quiet presence

Hotels in Hong Kong
Sheung Wan